East Hemet is a census-designated place (CDP) in Riverside County, California, United States, located east of Hemet. East Hemet is in an unincorporated area outside the city limits of Hemet. The population was 17,418 at the 2010 census, up from 14,823 at the 2000 census.

Geography
East Hemet is located at  (33.736120, -116.940305).

Demographics

2010
The 2010 United States Census reported that East Hemet had a population of 17,418. The racial makeup of East Hemet was (62.4%) White, (11.9%) African American, (1.9%) Native American, (1.6%) Asian, (0.2%) Pacific Islander, (17.2%) from other races, and (4.9%) from two or more races. Hispanic or Latino of any race was 38.9%.

The Census reported that 17,352 people (99.6% of the population) lived in households, 56 (0.3%) lived in non-institutionalized group quarters, and 10 (0.1%) were institutionalized.

There were 5,320 households, out of which 2,499 (47.0%) had children under the age of 18 living in them, 2,908 (54.7%) were opposite-sex married couples living together, 936 (17.6%) had a female householder with no husband present, 408 (7.7%) had a male householder with no wife present.  There were 429 (8.1%) unmarried opposite-sex partnerships, and 48 (0.9%) same-sex married couples or partnerships. 797 households (15.0%) were made up of individuals, and 349 (6.6%) had someone living alone who was 65 years of age or older. The average household size was 3.26.  There were 4,252 families (79.9% of all households); the average family size was 3.55.

The population was spread out, with 5,224 people (30.0%) under the age of 18, 1,912 people (11.0%) aged 18 to 24, 4,319 people (24.8%) aged 25 to 44, 4,145 people (23.8%) aged 45 to 64, and 1,818 people (10.4%) who were 65 years of age or older.  The median age was 32.2 years. For every 100 females, there were 98.1 males.  For every 100 females age 18 and over, there were 94.5 males.

There were 5,869 housing units at an average density of 1,125.8 per square mile (434.7 per km2), of which 3,510 (66.0%) were owner-occupied, and 1,810 (34.0%) were occupied by renters. The homeowner vacancy rate was 3.5%; the rental vacancy rate was 10.1%.  10,808 people (62.1% of the population) lived in owner-occupied housing units and 6,544 people (37.6%) lived in rental housing units.

2000
As of the census of 2000, there were 14,823 people, 4,831 households, and 3,787 families residing in the CDP.  The population density was 4,597.8 people per square mile (1,777.4 per km2).  There were 5,064 housing units at an average density of 1,570.7 per square mile (607.2 per km2).  The racial makeup of the CDP was 70.0% White, 12.5% Black or African American, 1.4% Native American, 1.0% Asian, 0.1% Pacific Islander, 11.9% from other races, and 4.0% from two or more races.  23.9% of the population were Hispanic or Latino of any race.

There were 4,831 households, out of which 42.4% had children under the age of 18 living with them, 57.7% were married couples living together, 15.1% had a female householder with no husband present, and 21.6% were non-families. 17.4% of all households were made up of individuals, and 7.9% had someone living alone who was 65 years of age or older.  The average household size was 3.0 and the average family size was 3.4.

In the CDP, the population was spread out, with 32.8% under the age of 18, 8.5% from 18 to 24, 26.1% from 25 to 44, 19.8% from 45 to 64, and 12.8% who were 65 years of age or older.  The median age was 33 years. For every 100 females, there were 94.4 males.  For every 100 females age 18 and over, there were 89.5 males.

The median income for a household in the CDP was $39,828, and the median income for a family was $42,356. Males had a median income of $34,500 versus $24,493 for females. The per capita income for the CDP was $15,486.  About 13.4% of families and 17.1% of the population were below the poverty line, including 22.4% of those under age 18 and 8.0% of those age 65 or over.

Government

References

Census-designated places in Riverside County, California
Census-designated places in California